Colemak is a keyboard layout for Latin-script alphabets, designed to make typing more efficient and comfortable by placing the most frequently used letters of the English language on the home row. Created on 1 January 2006, it is named after its inventor, Shai Coleman.

Most major modern operating systems such as Mac OS, Linux, Android, ChromeOS, and BSD support Colemak natively. A program to install the layout is available for Microsoft Windows. On Android and iOS, the layout is offered by several virtual keyboard apps like GBoard and SwiftKey, as well as by many apps which support physical keyboards directly.


Overview

The Colemak layout was designed with the QWERTY layout as a base, changing the positions of 17 keys while retaining the QWERTY positions of most non-alphabetic characters and many popular keyboard shortcuts, supposedly making it easier to learn than Dvorak layout for people who already type in QWERTY without losing efficiency. It shares several design goals with the Dvorak layout, such as minimizing finger path distance and making heavy use of the home row. 74% of typing is done on the home row compared to 70% for Dvorak and 32% for QWERTY. The default Colemak layout lacks a Caps Lock key; an additional Backspace key occupies the typical position of Caps Lock on modern keyboards.

Coleman states that he designed Colemak to be easy to learn, explaining that Dvorak is hard for QWERTY typists to learn due to it being so different from the QWERTY layout. The layout has attracted media attention as an alternative to Dvorak for improving typing speed and comfort with an alternate keyboard layout.

Variants

A series of intermediate layouts known as Tarmak have been created with the intention of making it easier for new users to adopt the layout. The layouts change only 3–5 keys at a time in a series of 5 steps.

Colemak has been criticised for placing too much emphasis on the middle-row center-column keys (D and H) leading to lateral finger stretches for certain common English bigrams such as HE. Some find these awkward. The Colemak user community developed a modified version of Colemak named Colemak-DH, to address these concerns.

The Colemak community has created several other modifications and variants; some of these are not directly related to Colemak but would work on other layouts as well. The web site "DreymaR's Big Bag of Keyboard Tricks" holds info on such mods and tools and their implementations as well as other typing-related topics, centered around but not limited to the Colemak layout.

References

External links
 Official Colemak website (including community forum)
 Community Colemak website
 Colemak Mod-DH

Keyboard layouts
Latin-script keyboard layouts